Kate Saunders (born 4 May 1960 in London) is an English writer, actress and journalist. She has won the Betty Trask Award and the Costa Children's Book Award and been twice shortlisted for the Carnegie Medal.

Biography
Kate Saunders is the daughter of the early public relations advocate Basil Saunders and his journalist wife Betty (née Smith), She has worked for newspapers and magazines in the UK, including The Sunday Times, Sunday Express, Daily Telegraph, She and Cosmopolitan.

She has also been a regular contributor to radio and television, with appearances on the Radio 4 programmes Woman's Hour, Start the Week and Kaleidoscope. She was, with Sandi Toksvig, a guest on the first episode of the long-running news quiz programme Have I Got News for You. The BBC children's series Belfry Witches was based on her series of children's books about two mischief-making witches.

Saunders won the annual Costa Children's Book Award for Five Children on the Western Front (2014), a contribution to the classic fantasy series that E. Nesbit inaugurated in 1902 with Five Children and It. She was also a contributor to the authorised Winnie-the-Pooh sequel, The Best Bear in All the World. Her children's novel The Land of Neverendings has been shortlisted for the 2019 Carnegie Medal, as was Five Children on the Western Front in 2016.

She has written many novels, such as Wild Young Bohemians, and also co-wrote Catholics and Sex (1992) with Peter Stanford, who was then editor of the Catholic Herald. Saunders and Stanford later presented a television series based on the book on Channel 4.

Saunders' acting work includes an appearance as a policewoman dated by Rodney Trotter in Only Fools and Horses episode in 1982.

Selected books

Novels
The Prodigal Father (1986) - Won The Betty Trask Award in 1986
Storm in the Citadel (1989)
Night Shall Overtake Us (1993)
Wild Young Bohemians (1995)
Lily-Josephine (1998)
The Marrying Game (2002)
Bachelor Boys (2004)
Crooked Castle (2013)
Mariana (2013)

The Laetitia Rodd Mysteries 
The Secrets of Wishtide (2016)
The Case of the Wandering Scholar (2019)
The Mystery of the Sorrowful Maiden (2021)

Children's books
A Spell of Witches (1999)
The Belfry Witches (omnibus) (2003)
Cat and the Stinkwater War (2003)
The Little Secret (2006)
Beswitched (2010)
Magicalamity (2011)
The Whizz Pop Chocolate Shop (2012)
The Curse of The Chocolate Phoenix (2013)
Five Children on the Western Front (2014)
The Land of Neverendings (2017)

Filmography

Film

Television

References

External links
 
 

1960 births
Living people
Actresses from Sheffield
English journalists
21st-century English novelists
English non-fiction writers
English fantasy writers
English children's writers
Actresses from London
English television actresses
The Sunday Times people
21st-century British short story writers
21st-century English women